is a  Tendai Buddhist temple complex in Ukyō-ku, a western ward in the city of Kyoto, Japan. The temple is a popular destination during the Japanese maple viewing season (the momiji season).

Two revered images
The temple derives its name from the fact that there are two main images here—one statue of the founding Buddha and another statue of one who has reached enlightenment; or in short, Nison refers to these "two revered images." Both of these Heian period Buddhist statues are designated as Important Cultural Properties of Japan.

The name Nison-in derives from the temple's two principal image, Shaka Nyorai (called the "Gautama Buddha of Hakken" who is said to send out the world's new-borns), and Amitabha Tathagata (called the "Amitabha of Raigei" who allegedly greets those who've died).

History
Nison-in was founded in the early Heian period. Emperor Saga initiated the establishment of the temple in 834; and today it is part of the Enryaku-ji temple group. None of the original structures survived destruction during the Onin War (1467–1477).

Nison-in is renowned for its ancient cemetery, which includes the graves of emperors and members of the aristocracy. The father of Sanjōnishi Sanetaka is buried in Nison-in cemetery

Nison-in became obliquely involved in the complex fabric of events which unfolded after Commodore Matthew C. Perry's Black Fleet sailed into Edo harbour in 1853.  For the first time in more than two centuries, the Tokugawa shogunate actively sought advice from the emperor.  Emperor Komei was asked for his counsel in deciding how to deal with newly assertive foreign powers. Amongst others, Naidaijin Sanjo Saki sought to uphold and defend the Imperial honor by trying to work with Tokugawa Nariaki in arguing against the conciliatory approach favored by Hayashi Akira and the bafuku negotiators.  As an unanticipated consequence, Sanjo was ordered to retire to the life of a monk at Nison-in.  Sanjo died while still in confinement at the temple.  After learning of his death, Komei sent Imperial envoys to Nison-in to elevate the late-courtier to the posthumous rank of Udaijin.

Karuta
This location of the temple on Mount Ogura is said to have been the site of a villa belonging to Fujiwara no Teika, the poet who compiled the anthology .

Every year in May, the temple plays host to a re-enactment of a Heian-era literary card game played by women in period costume.

See also
 Yasaka Shrine in Kyoto on January 3, when the “Ceremony of the first karuta play of the year” is held
 For an explanation of terms concerning Japanese Buddhism, Japanese Buddhist art, and Japanese Buddhist temple architecture, see the Glossary of Japanese Buddhism.

Notes

References
 Cullen, L.M. (2003).  A History of Japan, 1582-1941: Internal and External Worlds. Cambridge: Cambridge University Press.  (cloth).  (paper)
 Goto, Michiko.  "The Lives and Roles of Women of Various Classes in the Ie of Late-Medieval Japan," International Journal of Asian Studies (2006), 3:2, pp. 183–210.
 Poppelreuter, Tanja and Gary Quigg.  "Arashiyama on wheels," Kansai Scene Magazine. November 2006.
 Satow, Ernest Mason. (1905).  Japan 1853-1864 .  Tokyo: Naigai suppan kyokai.

External links

 University of Pennsylvania, Fine Arts Library Image Collection:  "Portrait of the Monk Honen"

1st-millennium establishments in Japan
Buddhist temples in Kyoto
Tendai temples
Religious organizations established in the 9th century
Important Cultural Properties of Japan
Hōnen